Saint Kizito (1872 – June 3, 1886) was one of the Martyrs of Uganda and the youngest martyr slain by the King Mwanga II of Buganda. He was baptized on 25/26 May 1886, by Charles Lwanga, the leader of Uganda's Christian community at the time, at Munyonyo, and burned alive on 3 June 1886 in Namugongo. He was canonized on 18 October 1964 by Pope Paul VI in Rome. His feast day is on June 3rd. He is considered as the patron saint of children and primary schools.

See also
St. Kizito, a mixed secondary school in Kenya
St Kizito Catholic School in Botswana, www.stkizitocatholicschool.co.bw

External links

Saint Kizito at Patron Saints Index
Kizito's profile from Dictionary of African Christian Biography
Kizito's profile from UgandaMartyrsShrine.org
LIST OF UGANDA MARTYRS 
The Uganda Martyrs from the August 2008 issue of The Word Among Us magazine
St. Kizito and his parentage.
The Family Kizito in Haiti

References 

1872 births
1886 deaths
19th-century Christian saints
19th-century executions by Uganda
19th-century Roman Catholic martyrs
Roman Catholic child saints
Converts to Roman Catholicism from pagan religions
Executed children
Executed Ugandan people
People executed by Buganda
People executed by Uganda by burning
Ugandan Roman Catholic saints